The Beaumont Hotel is located in Mayville, Wisconsin.

History
Now known as the Audubon Inn, the hotel was originally built for Jacob Mueller, publisher of the Dodge County Pioneer, a German-language newspaper. It is located within the Main Street Historic District.

References

Hotel buildings on the National Register of Historic Places in Wisconsin
National Register of Historic Places in Dodge County, Wisconsin
Queen Anne architecture in Wisconsin
Brick buildings and structures
Hotel buildings completed in 1896